Machchangolhi, also known as Machangolhi, is a district of Malé, Maldives.

Location within Malé City 
Machchangolhi is in the southern and central portions of Malé Island:

References 

Populated places in the Maldives